Riders of Mystery is a 1925 American silent Western film directed by Robert N. Bradbury and starring Bill Cody, Frank Rice, and Thomas G. Lingham.

Plot
As described in a film magazine review, the Sheriff is shot while trying to capture a band of robbers. Bob takes him to a shack for shelter. In bringing back his belt for identification by his daughter, Bob is framed by the villain John and taken to jail. He escapes and captures the bandits.

Cast
 Bill Cody as Bob Merriwell
 Frank Rice as Jerry Jones
 Thomas G. Lingham as John Arliss 
 Peggy O'Day as Helen Arliss 
 Mack V. Wright as Dan Blair

References

Bibliography
 Munden, Kenneth White. The American Film Institute Catalog of Motion Pictures Produced in the United States, Part 1. University of California Press, 1997.

External links
 
 

1925 films
1925 Western (genre) films
1920s English-language films
American black-and-white films
Films directed by Robert N. Bradbury
Silent American Western (genre) films
1920s American films